San Salvatore in Lauro is a Catholic church in central Rome, Italy. It is located on a piazza of the same name in the rione Ponte. It stands on Via Vecchiarelli, just south of the Lungotevere Tor di Nona and north of via dei Coronari. It is the "national church" of the marchigiani, the inhabitants of the Marche region of Italy (the population of each of Italy's regions was counted as a "nation" before Italian unification). The current protector of this titulus is Cardinal-Deacon Angelo Comastri.

History
The oldest attestation of the church has it built on the ruins of an ancient pagan temple dedicated to the goddess Europa and surrounded by laurel trees. The first church at the site dates to the 11th century; while the present building was constructed in the 16th century on designs of the Bolognese Ottaviano Mascherino. The façade was finished only in 1862 by the architect Camillo Guglielmetti, winner of the competition organized by the Accademia di San Luca.

The main altarpiece and cupola are painted by Ludovico Rusconi Sassi. In the chapels are works of art by Antoniazzo Romano, Camillo Rusconi, François Duquesnoy, a San Carlo Borromeo by Alessandro Turchi and a Nativity by Pietro da Cortona. The refectory has a series of Mannerist frescoes (1550) by Francesco Salviati (1550), and contains the 15th century tomb of Pope Eugene IV by Isaia da Pisa, transferred here from the Old Saint Peter's Basilica. Parmigianino's Vision of Saint Jerome was commissioned for a chapel in the church, but was later brought away by the donors and is now in the National Gallery, London.

The titular church was first established in 1587 as a Cardinal-Priest title but was suppressed in 1670. In the consistory of 24 November 2007 Pope Benedict XVI restored the church as a Cardinal-Deaconry.

List of Cardinal Protectors

Scipione Lancellotti (20 April 1587 – 2 June 1598) 
Luca Antonio Virili (17 December 1629 – 4 June 1634) 
Ciriaco Rocci (13 August 1635 – 25 September 1651) 
Pietro Vito Ottoboni (19 February 1652 – 15 November 1660)
Angelo Comastri (24 November 2007 –)

External links
 Church website
 

12th-century Roman Catholic church buildings in Italy
Burial places of popes
Titular churches
Salvatore Lauro